Jean-Claude Étienne (6 August 1941, Vouziers (Ardennes) – 11 March 2017) was a French politician, and a member of the Senate of France. He represented the Marne department and is a member of the Union for a Popular Movement Party.

Biography 
Professor of medicine by profession, he was elected Senator of the Marne on 23 September 2001 after being member of the second district of the Marne.

On 27 October 2010, he was appointed member of the group of electable individuals to the French Economic, Social and Environmental Council (CESE). He was replaced in the French Senate by Mireille Oudit, from 3 November 2010.

Local mandates 
 1986 - 1998 : Regional Councillor Champagne-Ardenne
 1995 - in 2001 : Councillor Reims
 1996 - 1998 : Senior Vice President of Regional Council of Champagne-Ardenne
 1998 - 2004 : Chairman of the Regional Council of Champagne-Ardenne
 2004 - 2010 : Regional Council of Champagne-Ardenne

Parliamentary seats 
 2 April 1993 - 30 September 2001 : Representative (RPR) of the second district of the Marne
 1 October 2001 - 2 November 2010 : Senator (RPR and UMP) of the Marne

Other functions 
 Senior Vice President of the Parliamentary Office for Science and Technology
 Member of the High Council for Biotechnology
 Member of the group of electable individuals to the CESE

References

Page on the Senate website

1941 births
2017 deaths
French Senators of the Fifth Republic
Union for a Popular Movement politicians
Debout la France politicians
Senators of Marne (department)